Adam McDonough (born September 24, 1985) is an American retired mixed martial artist who competed in Bellator's Welterweight division.

Mixed martial arts career

Early career
McDonough started his professional career in 2007. He fought mainly for Minnesota–based promotions as Brutaal Fight Night and Cage Fighting Xtreme, and also fought once for King of the Cage. He also trained and fought out of St. Cloud MN for Damage Inc.

After amassing a record of eight victories and no losses, McDonough signed with Bellator.

Bellator MMA
McDonough made his promotional debut against Johnny Buck on September 20, 2013 at Bellator 100. Buck was defeated via TKO due to a spinning back kick to the body and a finishing sequence of punches.

McDonough was scheduled to face Mark Scanlon in the quarterfinal match of Bellator Season 10 Welterweight Tournament on March 14, 2014 at Bellator 112. However, after the removal of Scanlon, Joe Riggs and War Machine citing injuries, the tournament line–up was shifted and McDonough instead faced Jesse Juarez. McDonough won via unanimous decision (29–28, 29–28, 29–28) and advanced to the semifinals.

In the semifinal, McDonough faced Nathan Coy on April 11, 2014 at Bellator 116. He won via knockout early in the second round.

In the final, McDonough faced Andrey Koreshkov at Bellator 122 on July 25, 2014. He lost the fight via unanimous decision, resulting in the first loss of his professional MMA career.

Championships and accomplishments
 Cage Fighting Xtreme
 CFX Welterweight Championship (One time)

Mixed martial arts record

|-
| Loss
| align=center | 11–1
| Andrey Koreshkov
| Decision (unanimous)
| Bellator 122
| 
| align=center | 3
| align=center | 5:00
| Temecula, California, United States
| 
|-
| Win
| align=center | 11–0
| Nathan Coy
| TKO (punch)
| Bellator 116
| 
| align=center | 2
| align=center | 0:30
| Temecula, California, United States
| 
|-
| Win
| align=center | 10–0
| Jesse Juarez
| Decision (unanimous)
| Bellator 112
| 
| align=center | 3
| align=center | 5:00
| Hammond, Indiana, United States
| 
|-
| Win
| align=center | 9–0
| Johnny Buck
| TKO (spinning back kick and punches)
| Bellator 100
| 
| align=center | 1
| align=center | 4:51
| Phoenix, Arizona, United States
|
|-
| Win
| align=center | 8–0
| James Wood
| Decision (unanimous)
| CFX: Hostile
| 
| align=center | 3
| align=center | 5:00
| Morton, Minnesota, United States
|
|-
| Win
| align=center | 7–0
| Matt Delanoit
| KO (punches)
| CFX: Gladiator Revolution
| 
| align=center | 2
| align=center | 2:30
| Brainerd, Minnesota, United States
| 
|-
| Win
| align=center | 6–0
| B.J. VanBueskom
| TKO (punches)
| KOTC: Mainstream
| 
| align=center | 2
| align=center | 2:30
| Morton, Minnesota, United States
|
|-
| Win
| align=center | 5–0
| Bill Stanton
| Submission (arm–triangle choke)
| CFX: Armageddon in Alexandria
| 
| align=center | 1
| align=center | 1:23
| Alexandria, Minnesota, United States
|
|-
| Win
| align=center | 4–0
| Jeremy Elisius
| TKO (punches)
| Brutaal Fight Night 27
| 
| align=center | 1
| align=center | 4:20
| St. Cloud, Minnesota, United States
|
|-
| Win
| align=center | 3–0
| Robbie Kriesel
| TKO (punches)
| Brutaal Fight Night 10
| 
| align=center | 1
| align=center | 4:40
| St. Cloud, Minnesota, United States
|
|-
| Win
| align=center | 2–0
| Nick Almen
| Submission (keylock)
| CFX 7: Brutal
| 
| align=center | 1
| align=center | N/A
| St. Cloud, Minnesota, United States
|
|-
| Win
| align=center | 1–0
| Troy Canfield
| Submission (kimura)
| Brutaal Fight Night 2
| 
| align=center | 1
| align=center | N/A
| Maplewood, Minnesota, United States
|

See also
 List of Bellator MMA alumni

References

1985 births
Living people
St. Cloud State University alumni
People from Faribault, Minnesota
American male mixed martial artists
Mixed martial artists from Minnesota
Welterweight mixed martial artists
Mixed martial artists utilizing Brazilian jiu-jitsu
American practitioners of Brazilian jiu-jitsu